The 2021–22 season was the 111th season in the existence of Grenoble Foot 38 and the club's third consecutive season in the second division of French football. In addition to the domestic league, Grenoble participated in this season's edition of the Coupe de France.

Players

First-team squad

Out on loan

Transfers

Pre-season and friendlies

Competitions

Overall record

Ligue 2

League table

Results summary

Results by round

Matches
The league fixtures were announced on 25 June 2021.

Coupe de France

References

Grenoble Foot 38 seasons
Grenoble